The 2018 American Athletic Conference football season is the 27th NCAA Division I FBS Football season of the American Athletic Conference (The American). The season is the sixth since the former Big East Conference dissolved and became the American Athletic Conference, and the fifth season with the College Football Playoff in place. The American is considered a member of the "Group of Five" (G5), meaning that the conference shares with the other G5 conferences one automatic spot in the New Year's Six bowl games. The entire schedule was released on February 13.

Previous season
UCF defeated Memphis in the 2017 AAC Championship game' The game was a rematch of the September 30 matchup, which UCF won 40–13.

Seven Teams participated in bowl games, and finished with a record of 4–3.  UCF defeated Auburn 34–27 in the Peach Bowl. The Knights finished the regular season 12–0. The effort came just two years after an 0–12 winless season (2015). UCF became the first team in the history of NCAA Division I FBS to improve from a winless regular season to an undefeated regular season in only two years.  Memphis lost to Iowa State 20–21 in the 2017 Liberty Bowl. Navy defeated Virginia in the Military Bowl 49–7, Houston lost to Fresno State in the Hawaii Bowl 27–33. USF Defeated Texas Tech 38–24 in the Birmingham Bowl. Temple defeated FIU 28–3 in the Gasparilla Bowl, and SMU lost to Louisiana Tech 10–51 in the Frisco Bowl.

Preseason

Recruiting classes

American Athletic Conference Media Day
The American Athletic Conference Media Day took place July 18 in Newport, Rhode Island.

Preseason Media Poll

AAC Champion Voting
 UCF – 19 
 Memphis – 7
 USF – 3
 Houston – 1

 
East
 1. UCF (175 pts., 25 votes)
 2. USF (140 pts., 5 votes)
 3. Temple (132 pts.)
 4. Cincinnati (91 pts.)
 5. Connecticut (51 pts.)
 6. East Carolina (41 pts.)

West
 1. Memphis (171 pts., 23 votes)
 2. Houston (146 pts., 4 votes)
 3. Navy (129 pts., 3 votes)
 4. SMU (72 pts.)
 5. Tulane (68 pts.)
 6. Tulsa (44 pts.)

References:

Fifth Anniversary Football Team
with 2018 marking the Fifth Year of American Athletic Conference Football under the new league, the Conference announced the Fifth Anniversary Team

Head coaches

Coaching changes
There were two coaching changes after the regular season ended, On December 2, 2017 Scott Frost left UCF to take the Nebraska job, but stayed on to coach in the AAC Championship game and Peach Bowl, UCF ended up hiring Missouri Offensive Coordinator Josh Heupel. On December 7, 2017 SMU coach Chad Morris left to take the Arkansas job, on December 12, 2017 former Cal coach Sonny Dykes was hired as the new SMU coach.

Coaches
Note: All stats current through the completion of the 2017 season

Source:

Rankings

Schedule

Week 1

Week 2

Week 3

Week 4

Week 5

Week 6

Week 7

Week 8

Week 9

Week 10

Week 11

Week 12

Week 13

Week 14

AAC Championship game

Week 15

Bowl games

(Rankings from final CFP Poll; All times Eastern)

American vs other conferences

American vs Power conference matchups
This is a list of the power conference teams (ACC, Big 10, Big 12, Notre Dame, Pac-12 and SEC) The American will playing during the 2018 season.

Records against other conferences 

Regular Season

Post Season

Awards and honors

Players of the week

Conference awards
The following individuals received postseason honors as voted by the American Athletic Conference football coaches at the end of the season

NFL Draft

The following list includes all AAC players who were drafted in the 2019 NFL draft.

Notes

References